Mohamed Abdul Hamid (born December 24, 1980) is a Sudanese former swimmer, who specialized in sprint freestyle events. Hamid competed for Sudan in the men's 50 m freestyle at the 2000 Summer Olympics in Sydney. He received a ticket from FINA, under a Universality program, without meeting an entry time. He challenged six other swimmers in heat one, including 16-year-olds Wael Ghassan of Qatar and Hassan Mubah of the Maldives. Before the start of his heat, Hamid immediately jumped into the pool first, and was cast out of the race for breaching a no false-start rule in the prelims.

References

1980 births
Living people
Sudanese male freestyle swimmers
Olympic swimmers of Sudan
Swimmers at the 2000 Summer Olympics